The Fairchild PT-19 (company designation Fairchild M62) is an American  monoplane primary trainer aircraft that served with the United States Army Air Forces, RAF and RCAF during World War II. Designed by Fairchild Aircraft, it was a contemporary of the Kaydet biplane trainer, and was used by the USAAF during Primary Flying Training. As with other USAAF trainers of the period, the PT-19 had multiple designations based on the powerplant installed.

Design and development
The PT-19 series was developed from the Fairchild M-62 when the USAAC first ordered the aircraft in 1940 as part of its expansion program. The cantilever low-wing monoplane with fixed landing gear and tailwheel design was based on a two-place, tandem-seat, open cockpit arrangement. The simple but rugged construction included a fabric-covered welded steel tube fuselage.  The remainder of the aircraft used plywood construction, with a plywood-sheathed center section, outer wing panels and tail assembly. The use of an inline engine allowed for a narrow frontal area which was ideal for visibility while the widely set-apart fixed landing gear allowed for solid and stable ground handling.

The M-62 first flew in May 1939 and won a fly-off competition later that year against 17 other designs for the new Army training airplane. Fairchild was awarded its first Army PT contract for an initial order on 22 September 1939.

The original production batch of 275 were powered by the inline 175 hp Ranger L-440-1 engine and designated the PT-19. In 1941, mass production began and 3,181 of the PT-19A model, powered by the 200 hp L-440-3, were made by Fairchild. An additional 477 were built by Aeronca and 44 by the St. Louis Aircraft Corporation. The PT-19B, of which 917 were built, was equipped for instrument flight training by attaching a collapsible hood to the front cockpit.

When a shortage of engines threatened production, the PT-23 model was introduced which was identical except for the 220 hp Continental R-670 radial powerplant. A total of 869 PT-23s were built as well as 256 of the PT-23A, which was the instrument flight-equipped version. The PT-23 was manufactured in the US by Fairchild, Aeronca, St. Louis Aircraft Corporation and Howard Aircraft Corporation and in Canada by Fleet Aircraft Corporation as well as Fabrica do Galeao in Brazil (220 or 232 between 1944 and 1948).

During 1943, USAAF Training Command received a number of complaints about durability issues with the plywood wings of the PT-19 and the PT-23 when exposed to the high heat and/or humidity of training bases located in Texas and Florida.  Maintenance officers at the USAAF overhaul depots had been forced to order replacement of the wooden wing sections after only two to three months' active service because of wood rot and ply separation issues.  Subsequent to this incident, the USAAF incorporated a demand for all-metal wing sections on all future fixed-wing training aircraft.

The final variant was the PT-26 which used the L-440-7 engine. The Canadian-built versions of these were designated the Cornell for use by the British Commonwealth Air Training Plan which was centered in Canada.

Operational history

Compared to the earlier biplane trainers, the Fairchild PT-19 provided a more advanced type of aircraft. Speeds were higher and wing loading more closely approximated that of combat aircraft, with flight characteristics demanding more precision and care.  Its virtues were that it was inexpensive, simple to maintain and, most of all, virtually viceless. The PT-19 truly lived up to its nickname, the Cradle of Heroes. It was one of a handful of primary trainer designs that were the first stop on a cadet's way to becoming a combat pilot.

These planes were delivered to various bases all over the country by WASPs (Women's Airforce Service Pilots) between 1942-1944.

Thousands of the PT-19 series were rapidly integrated into the United States and Commonwealth training programs, serving throughout World War II and beyond. Even after their retirement in the late 1940s, a substantial number found their way onto the United States and other civil registers, being flown by private pilot owners.

Variants

PT-19
Initial production variant of the Model M62 powered by 175 hp L-440-1, 270 built.
PT-19A
As the PT-19 but powered by a 200 hp L-440-3 and detailed changes, redesignated T-19A in 1948, 3226 built.
PT-19B
Instrument training version of the PT-19A, 143 built and six conversions from PT-19A.
XPT-23A
A PT-19 re-engined with a 220 hp R-670-5 radial engine.
PT-23
Production radial-engined version, 774 built.
PT-23A
Instrument training version of the PT-23, 256 built.
PT-26
PT-19A variant with enclosed cockpit for the Commonwealth Air Training Scheme, powered by a 200hp L-440-3, 670 built for the Royal Canadian Air Force as the Cornell I.
PT-26A
As PT-26 but with a 200hp L-440-7 engine, 807 built by Fleet as the Cornell II.
PT-26B
AS PT-26A with minor changes, 250 built as the Cornell III.
Cornell I
RCAF designation for the PT-26.
Cornell II
RCAF designation for the PT-26A.
Cornell III

RCAF designation for the PT-26B.

Operators

 Brazilian Air Force

 Royal Canadian Air Force

 Chilean Air Force

 Colombian Air Force

 Ecuadorian Air Force

Guatemalan Air Force

Haiti Air Corps

Honduran Air Force - PT-23

 Indian Air Force

Mexican Air Force

 Nicaraguan Air Force

 Royal Norwegian Air Force

 Paraguayan Air Arm received a few Fairchild M-62s in 1940, followed by 15 Lend-Lease PT-19A in 1942-43. In the 1950s, 14 ex-Brazilian Air Force PT-19s (PT-3FG built under license in Brazil) were received. The last PT-19 was retired in 1972.

 Peruvian Air Force

Philippines Air Force

South African Air Force

Rhodesian Air Force

 Royal Air Force

 United States Army Air Corps/United States Army Air Forces

 Uruguayan Air Force received 17 PT-19As and PT-19Bs under Lend Lease in 1942, with 50 PT-26s being delivered in 1946–1947.
 Uruguayan Navy

 Aviación Militar received 20 PT-19As under Lend Lease.

Surviving aircraft

, there were 98 airworthy aircraft worldwide. 
One example is found at the Travis Air Force Base Aviation Museum, Travis Air Force Base, Fairfield, California.
Another is in storage at the Reynolds-Alberta Museum in Wetaskiwin, Alberta.
Fairchild PT-26A-FE Cornell II 'N58799' is flying in the Netherlands
Fairchild PT-19A (283435) is flying in Alabama with the Birmingham Escadrille of the Commemorative Air Force after a 22 year restoration started in 1986.

Specifications (PT-19A)

See also

Notes

Bibliography
 Andrade, John, U.S .Military Aircraft Designations and Serials since 1909 Midland Counties Publications, 1979, .
 Bridgman, Leonard. Jane's All the World's Aircraft 1948. London: Sampson Low, Marston & Company, Ltd., 1948.
 Bridgman, Leonard. Jane's All the World's Aircraft 1951–52. London: Sampson Low, Marston & Company, Ltd., 1951.
 Fricker, John. "Fuerza Aérea Paraguaya: Latin America's vest-pocket air force". Air International, Vol. 38 No. 5, May 1990. pp. 255–261. 
 
 Mondey, David. American Aircraft of World War II (Hamlyn Concise Guide). London: Bounty Books, 2006. .

 "Shoestring Top Cover...The Uruguayan Air Force". Air International, Vol. 39 No. 2, August 1990. pp. 65–73. 
 Steinemann, Peter. "Protector of the Plate". Air International, Vol. 42, No. 2, February 1992. pp. 73–78. .
 Swanborough, F.G. and Peter M. Bowers. United States Military Aircraft since 1909. London: Putnam, 1963.
 Taylor, Michael J.H. Jane's Encyclopedia of Aviation Vol. 3. London: Studio Editions, 1989. .
 "Venezuela Refurbishes Her Aerial Sombrero". Air International, Vol. 5 No. 3, September 1973. pp. 118–124, 150.
 "The World's Air Forces". Flight. Vol. 67, No. 2416, 13 May 1955. pp. 615–668.

External links
 
 Cavanaugh Flight Museum PT-19
 Golden Wings Flying Museum Fairchild PT-19A

Low-wing aircraft
Single-engined tractor aircraft
1930s United States military trainer aircraft
World War II trainer aircraft of the United States
PT-19
Aircraft first flown in 1939